Paula Lanz Blazquez (born 9 October 1996) is a Spanish professional racing cyclist. She rides for team Bizkaia–Durango.

See also
 List of 2015 UCI Women's Teams and riders

References

External links
 

1996 births
Living people
Spanish female cyclists
Place of birth missing (living people)
Cyclists from the Basque Country (autonomous community)
Sportspeople from Vitoria-Gasteiz